SHARC (Surface Hopping including ARbitrary Couplings) is an ab initio molecular dynamics program suite primarily dedicated to study the excited-state dynamics of molecules. It is free for academic use, open source released under the GNU General Public License.

History
The SHARC software suite was made publicly available in October 2014. It is developed by the SHARC development team in the group of Prof. Leticia_González at the Institute of Theoretical Chemistry at the University of Vienna, Austria.

Features
The SHARC molecular dynamics software can treat non-adiabatic couplings at conical intersections, intersystem crossing induced by spin-orbit coupling, and laser couplings on an equal footing. It has interfaces to the ab initio software packages MOLPRO, MOLCAS, ORCA_(quantum_chemistry_program), Gaussian_(software), TURBOMOLE, COLUMBUS (needs MOLCAS), BAGEL and to user-created LVC (linear vibronic coupling) models, to machine learning properties via the SchNarc approach, as well as to a tool for analytical potentials. Furthermore, it  includes auxiliary Python scripts for setup, maintenance and analysis of ensembles of trajectories.

Applications
The underlying methodology is based on Surface hopping, a semiclassical technique in computational chemistry. SHARC extends this method to treat spin-orbit couplings and laser interactions on an equal footing in addition to the originally included non-adiabatic effects. It has been applied to study strong laser interactions in the IBr molecule. Further applications, deal with photorelaxation in SO2, cytosine, and uracil

References

External links
 

Molecular dynamics software
science software